Maggie Feng (born July 11, 2000) is an American chess player and a Woman International Master.

Career 
Feng started playing chess when she was 8 years old. In 2016, she made history by becoming the first girl to win the U.S. Junior High School Championship (K9 section) with a score of 6½/7. She competed in the U.S. Women's Chess Championship for the first time in 2017, where she tied for 4th place out of 12 with a score of 6/11 points. In 2018, she placed 8th with a score of 4½; and in 2019, she placed 9th with a score of 4.

References

External links 
 
 
 Maggie Feng chess games at 365Chess.com

American chess players
21st-century chess players
Living people
2000 births